Institute for Clinical and Experimental Medicine (In Czech: Institut klinické a experimentální medicíny – IKEM) is the largest Czech medical research and clinical hospital located in Prague–Krč. It is directly managed the Ministry of Health and it was established in 1971 as a part of nearby Thomayer Hospital. It focuses on the treatment of cardiovascular diseases, organ transplantation, diabetology or metabolic disorders.

IKEM is made up of 3 specialized centers, 8 departments, 15 specialized departments, work bases and laboratories. It has around 1450 members of staff. There are a total of 312 beds available, of which 83 beds are in intensive care units as of 2020. As of 2019, it was the largest transplant center in Europe, transplanting 540 organs to 486 patients in 2019. Roughly 70% of all transplants in the country happen in IKEM.

See also 

 Institute of Experimental Medicine, Academy of Sciences of the Czech Republic – nearby institution

References

External links 

 

Hospitals in Prague
Teaching hospitals
Hospitals established in 1971
Prague 4
Research institutes established in 1971
Medical research institutes in the Czech Republic
1971 establishments in Czechoslovakia